

Home Learning Environment

Models of Literacy 
Most children are exposed to literacy skills by means of observation and modelling from those around them. Teachers, parents, and even siblings to some extent can play a large role in influencing emergent literacy development.

Parents can influence emergent literacy skills through informal play. In reference to learning, the definition of play is an activity a child chooses to do without force from external pressure. Some examples include: car games, songs, and storytelling. Parents are able to be guides as they possess the power to challenge their child’s thinking process in a way that can reformulate their concepts. Children need supportive intervention to reconstruct schemas and learn how to ask questions. For example, intervention would look like parents asking their child questions or to explain their thinking methods. Doing so would encourage the child to think abstractly at a young age. This could sound like

 "What if I replace the C in cat with a R, would it change the word?"
 "What if I take two marbles from the bag, how many are left?"
 "That is not a dog, it is a cat" (child might assume all furry animals are dogs, correction will create new schema)

Even in classroom settings, teachers can teach literacy skills in informal ways. In a research study done in 2001 by Laura Klenk, she observed two preschool teachers who sought to explore how children learn through observation in playful scenarios rather than stress-inducing environments like standardized testing, while also creating work spaces that display diversity with multilingual literature. The two teachers became models of literacy and it inspired parents to mimic the playful learning at home. Some activities the teachers proposed included: art free time increasing the use of writing tools, re-enacting stories from books they read as a class to record reading comprehension, and playing pretend (making grocery lists, playing office jobs, signing names). Teachers also have the opportunity to impose cultural integration through music, poster decorations, and diverse books. With this representation, students motivation to learn increases.

Having siblings can promote emergent literacy as younger siblings will want to imitate their older siblings and older siblings will feel eager to teach their younger siblings, which improves their learning comprehension skills. This could take form in storytelling and book reading between an older sibling and younger sibling. The older sibling could read to the younger sibling, and the younger sibling is listening and responding to the narrative. In this scenario, the older sibling is learning how to understand the text and convey it in a way that their audience understands whereas the younger sibling may be responding with questions or comprehending the words linguistically. Siblings taking on the role as literacy models is mutually beneficial as it means one sibling is practicing and reinforcing new knowledge while the other sibling is learning and reinterpreting the material being presented.

Bilingual Emergent Literacy  
This new term called dynamic bilingualism refers to the practice of multilingual interactions that occur on a daily basis in a cultural context. It is how people who speak different languages make meaning and methods of communication. In literacy, it is common for these groups of people, those who are not monolingual in English, are excluded and left unsupported. Emergent bilingualism becomes a literacy issue when marginalized groups are not presented the same opportunities as English monolingual learners in education. There is a need for diversity in classrooms, especially since literacy and obtaining an education was inaccessible to marginalized groups throughout history. The goal is not solely to teach students English, it is to encourage students to use their linguistic skills and developing their bilingual identities. Students can use bilingualism in literacy as their strength to attract different groups into one audience, as well as analyze using translingual styles from different cultures. The system of education that supports standardized, mono-glossic language fails to include bilingual students to an extent, and this can have lasting impacts on what identities get forgotten.

Adult Emergent Biliteracy 
Emergent literacy does not just occur in childhood. It can occur in adulthood, and it is very common among second-language students, also referred to as L2 writers. Many L2 writers lack certain literacy skills due to informal primary education whether it be a result of war, cultural customs, social class, or civil conflict. Different types of literacy is harder to develop in adulthood, like print literacy. This can be due to the fact that adult learners have to learn both grapheme-phoneme correspondences as well as an entire lexicon in a new language. Adults do have higher print awareness, but it is also difficult for the teachers to carry out instructions. A struggle L2 teachers see among their students is the inability to transition from classroom activities and apply those skills into individual writing. Researching L2 writers and their experiences creates a conflicting ethical question: how do we research these groups? But this issue in question brings attention to needed research that encourages diversity and inclusion in adult emergent literacy.

Emergent Literacy in Atypical Students 
An explanatory study was conducted to explore the emergent literacy skills within Spanish speaking children with developmental language disorder (DLD). Developmental Language Disorder is defined by ones inability or struggle with language comprehension skills that is not related to factors like genetics, autism, or brain injuries. Compared to the typically developed control group of children, code-related literacy skills were weaker among those in the DLD group. The results of this study propose the theory that there is a universal experience for those with developmental disorders and reading development, with no regards to the language they speak. Those with DLD often have difficulties with production of oral speech as well as written language. Additional cross-linguistic research is needed to explore whether early struggles really allude to reading disabilities in adulthood, but the study shows representation in research for children who are not deemed "typical" and it shows that emergent literacy looks different in every child.

References 

Wikipedia Student Program